John Edwin Treherne (15 May 1929 – 23 September 1989) was an English entomologist who specialized in insect biochemistry and physiology and conducted extensive experimental studies. He was also a noted author, including the historically located The Galapagos Affair (1983) which he wrote after spending some time in the Galapagos conducting research.

Treherne was born in Swindon and went to Headlands School, Swindon where his childhood friends included Desmond Morris and Diane Dors and studied zoology in Bristol University after which he spent a summer at Uppsala University, Sweden that made him interested in insect physiology.  He was conscripted into the war under the Royal Army Medical Corps where he met Trevor Shaw. He recollected that they would discuss evolution while on guard duty and were punished to patrol in the snow by a superior officer, a Christian fundamentalist. He then agreed with the officer that fossils had been planted by the devil and spent time indoors next to a fire and explained in later life would humorously argue that pragmatism and opportunism had a role in the survival of the fittest. After the war, he joined the Insect Physiology Unit at Downing College in Cambridge under Vincent Wigglesworth as a lecturer and reader. In 1955 he worked under the Agricultural Research Council to study digestion in Periplaneta americana making use of isotopes to trace the movement of glucose and trehalose. After Wigglesworth's retirement became a university lecturer and in 1971 he became a Reader in Experimental Biology. He headed the chemistry and physiology lab studying insect neurobiology, gut physiology, the chemistry of circadian rhythms and other biochemical studies in insects, annelids and molluscs. He collaborated with Simon Maddrell, Yves Pichon, Michael Bate, Malcolm Burrows and Roger Moreton and his students included Nancy Lane, Simon Maddrell, Mike Berridge, David Sattelle, Peter Evans, Philip Schofield, and Helen Skaer. He demonstrated the blood-brain barrier in insects, among the few invertebrates to have them. Treherne served as an editor for several journals, and was the vice-president of the Royal Entomological Society in 1967-68. In later life he began to take an interest in applying science to unsolved criminal mysteries and began to write books for pleasure including The Galapagos Affair (1983), The Strange History of Bonnie and Clyde (1984), Dangerous Precincts (1987). The Galapagos book was produced shortly after his visit to the islands to study the behaviour of Halobates. Among his ideas was the "Trafalgar Effect", that groups of Halobates could relay indication of a predator so that even the most distant individuals could take evasive action well before the predator became visible to them.

Treherne married June Vivienne Freeman in 1955 and they shared an interest in history and they had a son Mark and a daughter Rebecca.

References 

British entomologists
1929 births
1989 deaths
20th-century British zoologists